The Nassau Mountains is a mountain range in the Sipaliwini District of Suriname. It is named after the House of Nassau.

The nearby village of Nason is named after the mountain range.

In 2005, Guyanancistrus nassauensis, a new species of catfish, was discovered, and is endemic to the region.

References

Mountain ranges of Suriname